The 19th New Zealand Parliament was a term of the New Zealand Parliament. It opened on 24 June 1915, following the 1914 election. It was dissolved on 27 November 1919 in preparation for 1919 election.

Sessions
The 19th Parliament opened on 24 June 1915, following the 1914 general election. It sat for six sessions (with two sessions in 1918), and was dissolved on 27 November 1919.

Historical context
The 19th Parliament was the second term of the Reform Party government, which had been elected in the 1911 election. William Massey, the leader of the Reform Party, remained Prime Minister. The Liberal Party, led by former Prime Minister Joseph Ward, was technically the main opposition party, although for the majority of the term, the Liberals were part of a war-time coalition with Reform. Two small left-wing parties, the Social Democratic Party and the loosely grouped remnants of the United Labour Party, also held seats, and there was one left-wing independent (John Payne). During the 19th Parliament, the Social Democrats and most of the United Labour Party merged to form the modern Labour Party.

Party standings
There were 616,043 electors on the European roll, with 521,525 (84.66%) voting, including 5,618 informal votes. Turnout including Maori voters was 540,075. The following table shows votes at and party strengths immediately after the 1914 election:

1914–1916

1916–1919

Members

Initial MPs
76 general and 4 Māori electorates existed for the 19th Parliament.

By-elections during the 19th Parliament
There were a number of changes during the term of the 19th Parliament.

Summary of changes

Party changes
Thomas Rhodes, the Liberal Party MP for Thames, changed affiliation to the Reform Party in 1915.
The Social Democratic Party and the loose United Labour Party grouping merged to form the modern Labour Party on 7 July 1916. One ULP member, Bill Veitch, rejected the merger, and carried on as an independent.

Deaths
James Escott (Reform, Pahiatua) died on 28 July 1916.
1916 Pahiatua by-election – won by Harold Smith (Reform)
Robert McNab (Liberal, Hawkes Bay) died on 3 February 1917.
1917 Hawkes Bay by-election – won by John Findlay (Liberal)
Taare Parata (Liberal, Southern Maori) died on 8 January 1918.
1918 Southern Maori by-election – won by Hopere Uru (Independent)
Robert Fletcher (Liberal, Wellington Central) died on 4 September 1918.
1918 Wellington Central by-election – won by Peter Fraser (Labour)
Henry Okey (Reform, Taranaki) died on 13 September 1918
1918 Taranaki by-election – won by Sydney Smith (Independent aligned with Liberals)
Alfred Hindmarsh (Labour, Wellington South) died on 13 November 1918.
1918 Wellington South by-election – won by Bob Semple (Labour)
David Buick (Reform, Palmerston) died on 18 November 1918.
1918 Palmerston by-election – won by Jimmy Nash (Reform)
James Colvin (Liberal, Buller) died on 29 October 1919.
Seat remained vacant, as it was only two months until the general election.

Resignations
William Stewart (Reform, Bay of Islands) resigned in March 1917. Stewart won the seat in a by-election when the victory of another Reform candidate, Vernon Reed, had been overturned, and Stewart's resignation opened the way for Reed to return via another by-election.
1915 Bay of Islands by-election – won by William Stewart (Reform)
1917 Bay of Islands by-election – won by Vernon Reed (Reform)
Paddy Webb (Labour, Grey) resigned in November 1917. He then challenged the government to fight the resulting by-election on the issue of conscription, which Webb opposed. The government declined the challenge, and did not contest the by-election.
1917 Grey by-election – won by Paddy Webb (Labour)
Alexander Herdman (Reform, Wellington North) resigned in February 1918. Herdman, as Attorney-General, had just appointed himself to a judicial position, and was resigning in order to take up this role.
1918 Wellington North by-election – won by John Luke (Reform)

Expulsions
William Thomas Jennings (Liberal Party, Taumarunui) lost his seat in May 1915 when his election the previous year was declared void.
1915 Taumarunui by-election – won by William Thomas Jennings (Liberal)
Vernon Reed (Reform, Bay of Islands) lost his seat in May 1915 when his election the previous year was declared void. (His successor later resigned, allowing Reed to reclaim the seat).
1915 Bay of Islands by-election – won by William Stewart (Reform)
Paddy Webb (Labour, Grey) lost his seat in April 1918, having been jailed for refusing military service. (He had previously fought and won a by-election on the issue).
1918 Grey by-election – won by Harry Holland (Labour)

Notes

References

New Zealand parliaments